Ottaviano Riario (September 1479 – 1523) was an Italian condottiero and Lord of Imola and Forlì. Despite his nominal leadership, the real power lay with his mother Caterina Sforza.

Early life
He was the oldest son of Girolamo Riario, a nephew of Pope Sixtus IV who had obtained possessions in Italy thanks to the pontiff's patronage, and Caterina Sforza. After his father's murder, he was created lord of Imola and Forlì in July 1488 by Pope Innocent VIII, under the regency of his mother.

Despite his official status, the nine-year-old Ottaviano was, in reality, controlled by his domineering mother and her lover Giacomo Feo. When Feo humiliated Ottaviano in public by slapping him, his nominal courtiers did nothing to support him. After this episode, the situation in Forlì became very strained. Ottaviano's friends plotted to use the episode as an excuse to "liberate" the city from the rule of Giacomo Feo by assassinating him. The first attempt in 1490 failed. Five years later, on 27 August 1495, Feo was ambushed and killed. The fifteen-year-old Ottaviano was not involved.

Later lordship
Feo's death did not diminish the power of Ottaviano's mother, who continued to make decisions on his behalf. Ottaviano was employed twice by the Florentines as a condottiero to defend Florentine interests. He was offered 15,000 florins in 1497 and 10,000 in 1499. Niccolò Machiavelli undertook negotiations on the second occasion. Ottaviano was still only the nominal leader, as the actual negotiations were conducted with Caterina. 

However, Ottaviano personally commanded small forces in these local wars. In 1498 he took part in the siege of Pisa with 100 men-at-arms and 100 light horse. In 1499 he aided Ludovico Sforza, who was at war with the French and Venetians. At this point the Borgias decided to intervene. Pope Alexander VI sent his son Cesare Borgia to capture Imola and Forlì, claiming that dues had not been paid. Caterina and Ottaviano were deposed in January 1500.

After Alexander's death Ottaviano made several attempts to recapture his territories, but was unable to muster sufficient forces to achieve his goal.

Church career
Ottaviano later entered the church. On 16 September 1506 he was elected bishop of Viterbo and he remained in that position until his death in 1523.

Ancestry

References

Bibliography 

 

1479 births
1523 deaths
16th-century condottieri
Lords of Imola
Lords of Forlì
16th-century Italian Roman Catholic bishops